A Man for My Wife is a 1943 German comedy film directed by Hubert Marischka and starring Magda Schneider, Johannes Riemann and Clementia Egies.

The film's sets were designed by the art directors Hans Ledersteger and Ernst Richter.

Cast
Magda Schneider as Dagmar Stollberg
Johannes Riemann as Robert Stollberg
Clementia Egies as Manon
Rolf Weih as Peter Storm
Hedwig Bleibtreu as Grandmother Stollberg
Will Dohm as Felix Körner
Günther Lüders as Fritz Olden
Hans Brausewetter as Christian Brink
Erwin Biegel as Onkel Theodor
Erich Fiedler as Intrusive gentleman
Herbert Bach as Hansen
Gerda Scholz-Jürgen as Tante Therese
Charles Francois as a guest at Grandma's birthday party
Gerty Godden
Leo Peukert
Sonja Gerda Scholz
Hanns Waschatko

References

External links

Films of Nazi Germany
German comedy films
1943 comedy films
Films directed by Hubert Marischka
German black-and-white films
1940s German films